Ángela del Pan Moruno (born 19 April 1985) is a Spanish rugby sevens player. She competed at the 2016 Summer Olympics as a member of the Spanish women's sevens team. She was also in the squad that won the repechage spot for the Rio Olympics.

Del Pan also was in the squad at the 2013 Rugby World Cup Sevens.

References

External links 
 

1985 births
Living people
Spanish rugby union players
Spain international women's rugby union players
Spain international women's rugby sevens players
Olympic rugby sevens players of Spain
Rugby sevens players at the 2016 Summer Olympics
Sportspeople from Bilbao
Rugby union players from the Basque Country (autonomous community)